William Robinson was a Canadian immigrant. He was an African American devoted Sunday school teacher. In March 1868 in Salt Spring Island, British Columbia. A short investigation and trial convicted a local Chemainus Indigenous man named Tom (Tshuanahusset) for the murder, though later historians have questioned the verdict.

Life and murder
William Robinson, along with a few other African-Americans, immigrated to Salt Spring Island, British Columbia in Canada in the mid-1860s. He lived peacefully by himself in an isolated cabin and often attended church. Within a few years of his immigration, he was murdered. Evidence suggests that he was shot in the back while eating dinner. His murder was one of a string of murders that plagued this small community during the mid to late 1860s. An investigation was launched to discover who had committed the gruesome killing.

Investigation and trial	
The investigation soon concluded that a local Chemainus Indigenous man, Tshuanahusset, was responsible for William's murder.  A trial quickly found Tshuanahusset guilty and sentenced him to death shortly after.  Unfortunately for the community, Tshuanahusset's execution did not prevent another African-American settler, Giles Curtis, from being murdered.

The case against Tshuanahusset was questionable at best and historians have wondered whether or not he was the actual murderer.  Certain evidence does point to Tshuanahusset murdering William Robinson.  A local resident, John Norton, was told by an anonymous Indigenous person fishing near his house that Tshuanahusset had killed William Robinson and the murder weapon was hidden in a box in his house.  Furthermore, Sue Tas, a member of Tshuanahusset's tribe, claims to have been with Tshuanahusset when he murdered William Robinson and testified to this in court. 

The evidence against Tshuanahusset seems overwhelming, but there are many holes in the case against him. For example, the auger (allegedly belonging to Robinson) that was found in his house was 'lost' in the lake after it fell out of the Constable's canoe.  Tshuanahusset was also the only one seriously investigated, even though there were other people who should have been strong suspects in the investigation.  The killing of another African-American after Tshuanahusset's execution creates the possibility that Robinson's murderer struck again.  Who truly murdered William Robinson, however, has never been identified.

External links 
 Who Killed William Robinson? website

1868 murders in Canada
1868 deaths
Deaths by firearm in British Columbia
Deaths by person in Canada
History of Black people in British Columbia
Murder in British Columbia
1868 murders in North America